Gregory Charles Yaitanes (born June 18, 1970) is an American television and film director. He is also an angel investor in Twitter.

Early life
Yaitanes grew up in Wellesley, Massachusetts, where he directed his first film, Salad Bar: The Movie. At the age of 18, Yaitanes moved to Los Angeles and attended the University of Southern California Film School. By 23, he landed his first directorial job.

Career
Yaitanes has directed and produced shows including Damages, Lost, Prison Break, Heroes, Banshee, Grey's Anatomy, and House of the Dragon. His Emmy Award came in 2008 as result of his work on House, M.D.. He also directed the 2003 miniseries Frank Herbert's Children of Dune.

Yaitanes is one of Twitter's original investors and a frequent guest speaker at the company.

Active in the Greek community, Yaitanes helped produce Greek America Foundation's Gabby Awards and directed the opening of the 2011 Gabby Awards on Ellis Island.

Personal life
Yaitanes was married to Kosas founder Sheena Zadeh, who competed on Season 1 of the American version of MasterChef in 2010 and finished in 13th place, from 2012 until 2019. They have one daughter, Electra. Yaitanes splits his time between New York and Los Angeles and has two boys.

References

External links

1970 births
Film producers from Massachusetts
American television directors
Living people
People from Wellesley, Massachusetts
American people of Greek descent
Primetime Emmy Award winners
USC School of Cinematic Arts alumni
Film directors from Massachusetts